A resort town, often called a resort city or resort destination, is an urban area where tourism or vacationing is the primary component of the local culture and economy.  A typical resort town has one or more actual resorts in the surrounding area. Sometimes the term resort town is used simply for a locale popular among tourists. One task force in British Columbia used the definition of an incorporated or unincorporated contiguous area where the ratio of transient rooms, measured in bed units, is greater than 60% of the permanent population.

Generally, tourism is the main export in a resort town economy, with most residents of the area working in the tourism or resort industry. Shops and luxury boutiques selling locally themed souvenirs, motels, and unique restaurants often proliferate the downtown areas of a resort town.

In the case of the United States, resort towns were created around the late 1800s and early 1900s with the development of early town-making. Many resort towns feature ambitious architecture, romanticizing their location, and dependence on cheap labor.

Resort town economy
If the resorts or tourist attractions are seasonal in nature (such as a ski resort), resort towns typically experience an on-season where the town is bustling with tourists and workers, and an off-season where the town is populated only by a small amount of local year-round residents.

In addition, resort towns are often popular with wealthy retirees and people wishing to purchase vacation homes, which typically drives up property values and the cost of living in the region. Sometimes, resort towns can become boomtowns due to the quick development of retirement and vacation-based residences.

However, most of the employment available in resort towns are typically low paying and it can be difficult for workers to afford to live the area in which they are employed. Many resort towns have spawned nearby bedroom communities where the majority of the resort workforce lives.

Resorts towns sometimes struggle with problems regarding sustainable growth, due to the seasonal nature of the economy, the dependence on a single industry, and the difficulties in retaining a stable workforce.

Economic impact of tourism 
Local residents are generally receptive of the economic impacts of tourism. Resort towns tend to enjoy lower unemployment rates, improved infrastructure, more advanced telecommunication and transportation capabilities, and higher standards of living and greater income in relation to those who live outside this area. Increased economic activity in resort towns can also have positive effects on the country's overall economic growth and development. In addition, business generated by resort towns have been credited with supporting the local economy through times of national market failure and depression.

In a study conducted by the Urban and Regional Planning Department of Istanbul Technical University, 401 local residents in the resort community of Antalya were interviewed and asked to give their opinion on the economic impacts of tourism. Among the participants, 67% had lived in Antalya for over ten years, 66% had at least a high school degree, and 30% reported jobs that were related to tourism. The results are as follows:

Perceived impact on select economic impact items (Antalya)

More recently, resort towns have come under greater scrutiny by local communities. Instances where resort towns are poorly managed have adverse effects on the local economy. One example is the uneven distribution of income and land ownership between local residents and businesses. During tourist season, increased demand for accommodation may raise the price of land, causing a simultaneous increase in rent for local residents whose income in invariably lower than foreign residents. This results in a preponderance of foreigners in the land market and an erosion of economic opportunities for local residents.

The revenues amassed from tourism typically do not benefit the host country or the local communities. Income to local communities generated by tourism are all of the expenditures accrued after taxes, profits, and wages are paid out; however, around 80% of traveler's expenditures go to airlines, hotels, and international companies, not to local businesses. These funds are referred to as leakages. Tourism has also been blamed for other negative economic impacts to local communities. Although resort towns usually boast more improved infrastructure than surrounding areas, these developments usually present high costs to local governments and tax payers. Reallocating government funds to subsidize infrastructure and tax breaks to firms shift available funding to local education and health services. In addition, resort towns typically do not have dynamic economies, resulting in an over dependence on one industry. Economic dependence on tourism poses particular challenges to resort towns and its local residents given the seasonal nature of the job market in some areas. Local residents of resort towns face job insecurity, difficulties in obtaining training, medical-benefits, and housing.

Governance 
Every resort town is unique and local governance should be viewed on a case-by-case basis. There are, however, several broad criteria for insuring the most effective governance models. They include: implementation of necessary and desirable services to local residents; recover costs through fees, taxes, and charges; use of parcel taxes to fund services like recreation and fire protection; grant assistance to benefit local residents, like tax exemption; and delegate tasks to elected officials, staff, and committees to streamline procedures and save time and money. In most democratic systems, a voter must reside primarily in one place, and vote only for local government representatives in that place; however, some exceptions do exist. For example, in Alberta, Canada, there is a special type of municipal government for holiday areas called a summer village which allows non-permanent residents to vote for the council even if they only live there part-time.

Examples of resort towns

 Argentina
 Bariloche
 Mar del Plata
 Villa Gesell
 Australia
 Cairns
 Gold Coast
 Daylesford
 Hamilton Island
 Katoomba
 Port Douglas
 Shoalhaven
 Sunshine Coast
 Thredbo
 Yulara
Austria
 Ischgl, Tirol 
 Kitzbühel, Tirol 
 St. Anton, Tirol 
 Bahamas
 Cable Beach
 Paradise Island
 Bangladesh
 Cox's Bazar 
 Barbados
 Saint Lawrence Gap
 Belize
 Caye Caulker Village
 Placencia
 San Pedro Town
 Belgium
 De Panne
 Brazil
 Angra dos Reis
 Arraial do Cabo
 Balneário Camboriú
 Búzios
 Caldas Novas
 Costa do Sauípe
 Campos do Jordão
 Canela
 Florianópolis
 Fortaleza
 Foz do Iguaçu
 Gramado
 Guarujá
 Jericoacoara
 Maragogi
 Olímpia
 Petrópolis
 Poços de Caldas
 Porto de Galinhas
 Porto Seguro
 Pipa Beach
 Rio de Janeiro
 Trancoso
 Bulgaria
 Borovets
 Golden Sands
 Sunny Beach
 Cambodia
Sihanoukville
Siem Reap
 Canada (see also: cottage country)
 Banff
 Barrie
 Canmore
 Collingwood
 Fernie
 Jasper
 Kelowna
 Kimberley
 Lake Cowichan
 Lake Louise
 Mont Tremblant 
 Niagara Falls
 Saint Andrews
 Tofino
 The Blue Mountains
 Whistler 
 Chile
 Algarrobo
 Santo Domingo
 Pucón
 Villarrica
 Zapallar
 China
 Kuling town
 Lijiang
 Macau
 Sanya
 Colombia
 Barú Island
 Bocagrande, Cartagena
 Coveñas
 Girardot
 Melgar
 Palomino
 San Andres Island
 Tierra Bomba Island
 Cuba
 Varadero
 Czech Republic
 Staré Splavy
 Dominican Republic
 Punta Cana
 Ecuador
 Montañita
 Egypt
 El Gouna
 Marina
 Sahl Hasheesh
 Sharm el-Sheikh
 Siwa Oasis
 Estonia
 Haapsalu
 Kuressaare
 Pärnu
 Finland
 Hanko
 Kittilä
 Mariehamn
 Naantali
 France
 Cannes
 Deauville
 Nice
 Georgia
 Shovi
 Bakhmaro
 Gudauri
 Germany
 Baden-Baden
 Binz
 Garmisch-Partenkirchen 
 Heiligendamm
 Heringsdorf
 Rust
 Sassnitz
 Sellin
 Spiekeroog
 Warnemünde (part of Rostock)
 Greece
Asprovalta
Arachova
Aidipsos
Chalkidiki
Corfu
Elatochori
Hydra
Kamena Vourla
Karystos
Katakolo
Kineta
Kissamos
Kythnos
Laganas
Leptokarya
Litochoro
Loutraki
Malia
Monemvasia
Nafpaktos
Neoi Poroi
Olympic Coast
Parga
Platamon
Porto Cheli
Pylos
Santorini
Skyros Island
Syvota
 Hungary
 Bük
 Hévíz
 India
 Andaman & Nicobar Island
 Panaji
 Gulmarg
 Shimla
 Manali
 Mussoorie
 Lakshadweep
 Ooty
 Puducherry
 Alappuzha
 Madikeri
 Darjeeling
 Udaipur
 Indonesia
 Mandalika
 Nusa Dua
 Iran
 Sareyn
 Namak Abrud
 Ireland
 Bray
 Clonakilty
 Tramore
 Israel
 Eilat
 Italy
 Portofino
 Riccione
 Rimini
 Jamaica
 Negril
 Ocho Rios
 Japan
 Karuizawa
 Hakone
 Beppu
 Atami
 Hakuba
 Niseko
 Wakayama Marina City
 Latvia
 Jurmala
Lithuania
Birštonas
Druskininkai
Neringa
Palanga
 Malaysia
Langkawi
Penang
Pangkor
Cameron Highlands
Genting Highlands
Port Dickson
Malacca City
Desaru
Kuala Terengganu
Kundasang

 Malta
 St. Julian's (incl. Paceville)
 Sliema
 Mexico
 Acapulco
 Cabo San Lucas
 Cancún
 Cozumel
 Isla Mujeres
 Puerto Peñasco
 Puerto Vallarta
 Playa del Carmen
 Morocco
 Ifrane
 New Zealand
 Queenstown
Wanaka
 South Africa
 Ballito
 Langebaan
 Plettenberg Bay
 Port Elizabeth
 Umhlanga
 Nepal
 Pokhara
 North Korea
 Wonsan
 North Macedonia
 Mavrovo
 Ohrid
 Peru
 Urubamba
 Machupicchu Pueblo
 Philippines
 Baguio
 El Nido
 Island Garden City of Samal
 Lapu-Lapu City, Cebu
 Malay (Boracay)
 Pagudpud
 Panglao
 Puerto Galera
 Tagaytay
 Vigan
 Poland
 Jedlina-Zdroj
 Krynica Górska
 Misdroy
 Sopot
 Zakopane
 Portugal
 Caldas da Rainha
 Estoril
 Faro
 Figueira da Foz
 Lagos
 Puerto Rico
 Ponce
Romania
 Mamaia
 Poiana Brasov
 Russia
 Anapa
 Sochi
 Gelendzhik
 Singapore
Sentosa
 Slovakia
Piešťany
Starý Smokovec
Štrbské pleso
Tatranská Lomnica
 South Korea
 Jeju
 Spain
 Benidorm
 Blanes
 Calp
 Canary Islands
 Dénia
 Gran Canaria
 Ibiza
 Las Palmas
 Lloret de Mar
 Marbella
 Tenerife
 Torrevieja
 Tossa de Mar
 other in :Category:Resorts in Spain
 Switzerland
 Gstaad
 St. Moritz
 Verbier
 Syria
Aleppo
Slinfah
 Turkey
 Antalya
 Bodrum
 Kuşadası
 Marmaris
 Ukraine
 Alupka
 Feodosiya
 Sevastopol
 Yalta
 United Kingdom
 Ayr
 Blackpool
 Bournemouth
 Brighton
 Burntisland
 Deal, Kent
 Girvan
 Largs
 Llandudno
 Nairn
 Rothesay
 Saltcoats
 Skegness
 Southend-on-Sea
 Southport
 St Leonards-on-Sea
 Torquay
 Weston-super-Mare
 United States
 Aspen, Colorado
 Allenhurst, New Jersey
 Angel Fire, New Mexico
 Asbury Park, New Jersey
 Asheville, North Carolina
 Atlantic City, New Jersey
 Aventura, Florida
 Bar Harbor, Maine
 Big Bear Lake, California
 Big Sky, Montana
 Biloxi, Mississippi
 Branson, Missouri
 Bull Shoals, Arkansas 
 Camden, Maine
 Cape May, New Jersey
 Carlsbad, California
 Cloudcroft, New Mexico
 Coronado, California
 Daytona Beach, Florida
 Deal, New Jersey
 Destin, Florida
 Eagle Nest, New Mexico
 East Hampton, New York
 Eatontown, New Jersey
 Edgartown, Massachusetts
 Elberon, New Jersey
 Fire Island, New York
 Fish Creek, Wisconsin (Door County)
 Galveston, Texas
 Gatlinburg, Tennessee
 Glenwood Springs, Colorado
 Gulf Shores, Alabama
 Hershey, Pennsylvania
 Highlands, North Carolina
 Hilton Head Island, South Carolina
 Hot Springs, Arkansas
 Incline Village, Nevada
 Jackson, Wyoming
 Jacksonville Beach, Florida
 Jekyll Island, Georgia
 Kennebunkport, Maine
 Key West, Florida
 Laguna Beach, California
 Lake Geneva, Wisconsin
 Lake George, New York
 Las Vegas, Nevada
 Laughlin, Nevada
 Loch Arbour, New Jersey
 Long Beach, California
 Long Branch, New Jersey
 Mackinac Island, Michigan
 Mackinaw City, Michigan
 Mammoth, Wyoming
 Mammoth Lakes, California
 Marathon, Texas
 Marfa, Texas
 Martha’s Vineyard, Massachusetts
 Medicine Park, Oklahoma
 Miami Beach, Florida
 Moab, Utah
 Montauk, New York
 Monterey Bay, California
 Myrtle Beach, South Carolina
 Nahant, Massachusetts
 Nantucket, Massachusetts
 Newport, Rhode Island
 New Smyrna Beach, Florida
 Niagara Falls, New York
 Oak Bluffs, Massachusetts
 Ocean Beach, New York
 Ocean City, Maryland
 Ocean City, New Jersey
 Ocean Park, Maine
 Orange Beach, Alabama
 Orlando, Florida
 Ogunquit, Maine
 Old Orchard Beach, Maine
 Palm Beach, Florida
 Palm Springs, California
 Pinehurst, North Carolina
 Panama City Beach, Florida 
 Park City, Utah
 Pigeon Forge, Tennessee
 Provincetown, Massachusetts
 Put-In-Bay, Ohio
 Red River, New Mexico
 Rehoboth Beach, Delaware
 Ruidoso, New Mexico
 Sandusky, Ohio
 Santa Cruz, California
 Santa Fe, New Mexico
 Santa Monica, California
 Saint George, Utah
 Saint Simons Island, Georgia
 Scottsdale, Arizona
 Sedro-Woolley, Washington
 Sevierville, Tennessee
 Seward, Alaska
 Southampton, New York
 South Lake Tahoe, California
 South Padre Island, Texas
 Spearfish, South Dakota
 Stehekin, Washington
 Stowe, Vermont
 Sunny Isles, Florida
 Sun Valley, Idaho
 Terlingua, Texas
 Traverse City, Michigan
 Vail, Colorado
 Virginia Beach, Virginia
 Wells, Maine
 West Yellowstone, Montana
 Whitefish, Montana
 Wildwood, New Jersey
 Wisconsin Dells, Wisconsin
 Wrightsville Beach, North Carolina
 Wrightwood, California
 York Beach, Maine
 Uruguay
 Atlántida
 La Paloma
 Punta del Este
 Piriápolis
 Vietnam
 Nha Trang

See also
 Tourist attraction
 Tourist region
 Hill station

References

 
Types of towns
Town